Trotti (formerly Klondike, Old Trotti, and Trottie) is an unincorporated inhabited place located 16 km southeast of Newton in Newton County, Texas, United States.  The community was established as a logging camp, and was for a time known as Klondike in association with the gold producing area in Alaska.

References

Unincorporated communities in Texas
Unincorporated communities in Newton County, Texas